Bangladesh Shilpa Bank Bhaban is a tall high-rise located in Dhaka, Bangladesh. It is located in Motijheel, the central business district of the metropolis. It rises up to a height of 71 metres (233 ft) and comprises a total of 22 floors. It houses the headquarters of Bangladesh Shilpa Bank, the premier financial institution of the country. Bangladesh Shilpa Bank Bhaban is currently the 13th tallest building in Dhaka which is constructed by Concord Engineers and Construction Limited, a concern of Concord Group.

See also
 List of tallest buildings in Dhaka

References

Buildings and structures in Dhaka
Skyscraper office buildings in Bangladesh
Motijheel Thana
Office buildings completed in 1983
Bank buildings in Bangladesh